Daniel Jacoby (14 August 1933 – 31 March 2020) was a French lawyer who specialised in intellectual property law, human rights activist and writer.

Early and personal life 
He was born in Saint-Mandé (Val de Marne) on 14 August 1933. He fathered three children, Manuela, Anne-Carine and Jean-David.

Career 
He began his career in the 1960s in the Paris Court of Appeal, defending fighters of the Algerian resistance of the war of independence, as well as adversaries of Franco and the Soviet regimes. In  1970, he became a member of the International Federation for Human Rights (F.I.D.H.) and was the first cousin of Justice Robert Badinter and  French minister and the uncle of Zeev Gourarier French museum director.

International Federation for Human Rights président (F.I.D.H)
He became president between 1986 and 1995 and then became honorary president. In addition, he has participated in international judicial inquiries in different countries. For his work in the field of human rights, he was knighted and as an officer of the French Legion of Honor.

Writer 
He illustrated himself as a writer with Albert Cohen, writing the preface of the book Les Inedits. He published his first novel in 2007 Le Placard à Balai edition Gallimard, then Le livre des tremblements edition the belles lettre.

References

External links 

International Federation for Human Rights
1933 births
2020 deaths
French human rights activists
20th-century French lawyers
French writers